{{Infobox person
| name               = Sourav Das
| image              = 
| caption            = Sourav in an interview
| native_name        = 
| birth_date         = 
| nationality        = Indian
| education          = South Point School
| occupation         = Actor
| height_m           = 1.72
| height_ft          = 5’8| partner            = Anindita Bose
| mother             = Ajanta Das
| father             = Samar Das
| awards             = Films and Frames Digital Film Awards (2020)
| party              = All India Trinamool Congress
}}
Sourav Das (or sometimes spelled Saurav Das) is a Bengali actor, presenter, comedian, and theater director.

 Early life and career 
He graduated from South Point School in Kolkata. Then, he joined theater and later started his acting career in the Zee Bangla TV series Boyei Gelo, in which he played Birsa Basak, the younger brother of Arjun (the hero of the series). He made his Bollywood film debut with Kuchh Bheege Alfaaz directed by Onir. He has worked with acclaimed Bengali film directors like Anjan Dutt, Arindam Sil, Birsa Dasgupta, Kamaleshwar Mukherjee, and Raj Chakraborty. He made his debut as a playback singer in Zee Bangla Cinema Originals, Chore Chore Mastuto Bhai. 

 Works 

 Movies 

 Aashiqui (2015) Guti Malhar (2016)
 Dum Dum Digha Digha (2016)
 Gangster (2016)
 Guti Malhar Er Atithi (2017)
 One Night Stand (2017)
 Bolo Dugga Maiki (2017)
 Good Night City (2018)
 Ka Kha Ga Gha (2018)
 Reunion (2018)
 Teen Cup Cha (2018)
 Chore Chore Mastuto Bhai (2019)
 Finally Bhalobasha (2019)
 Sweater (2019)
 Ke Tumi Nandini (2019)
 Wrong Number (2019)
 Felunather Marksheet (2019)
 Bhalobashar Sohor (2019)
 Prem Amar 2 (2019)
 Teen Bindu (2019)
 Adda (2019)
 Kora Pak (2020)
 Archie (2020)
 Cheeni (2020)
 Pratidwandi (2021)Olpo Holeo Sotti (2021)Harano Prapti (2020)Iskabon (2022)Rish (2022)Bishakto Manush (2022)Kolkata Chalantika (2022)Karnasubarner Guptodhon (2022)Hridoypur (2022)Mir Jafar: Chapter 2'' (Upcoming)

Web series

Awards

References

External links 
 

Living people
1989 births
Bengali male television actors
Bengali actors
21st-century Indian actors